The 1995 St. Louis Stampede season was the first of two seasons for the St. Louis Stampede. They finished the 1995 Arena Football League season 9–3 and ended the season with a loss in the quarterfinals of the playoffs against the Albany Firebirds.

Schedule

Regular season

Playoffs
The Predators were awarded the No. 2 seed in the AFL playoffs.

Standings

Awards

References

St. Louis Stampede seasons
1995 Arena Football League season
St. Louis Stampede Season, 1995